Keith Stott (12 March 1944 – 5 March 2012) was an English professional footballer who played in the Football League as a defender.

References

1944 births
2012 deaths
People from Atherton, Greater Manchester
English footballers
Association football defenders
Crewe Alexandra F.C. players
Chesterfield F.C. players
Matlock Town F.C. players
English Football League players